Keshvari Rural District is a rural district (dehestan) in the Central District of Ilam County, Ilam Province, Iran. At the 2006 census, its population was 6,215, in 1,321 families.  The rural district has 4 villages. The rural District was established on March 9, 2013.

References 

Rural Districts of Ilam Province
Ilam County